The following is an incomplete list of sports stadiums in Africa. They are in order by their capacity, that is the maximum number of spectators the stadium can accommodate.
Most large stadiums in Africa are used for football (soccer), with some also used for athletics and rugby union.
Currently all African stadiums with a capacity of 25,000 or more are included. Soccer City in Johannesburg is currently the largest stadium in Africa since its capacity was increased to 94,700 for the 2010 FIFA World Cup. This event, which took place in June–July, was the first time an African country has hosted the World Cup. The Olympic Games have never been staged in Africa.

At a construction cost of $600 million, the Cape Town Stadium, located in the legislative capital of South Africa is the most expensive stadium in Africa. The stadium, which is often referred to as the “Green Point Stadium” because it sits on the piece land that previously housed the Green Point stadium, was constructed by an indigenous company, Murray & Roberts Construction Company.

Current stadiums

Capacity of 25,000 or more

Algeria below 25,000 capacity

Angola below 25,000 capacity

Angola below 25,000 capacity indoor stadiums

Benin below 25,000 capacity

Botswana below 25,000 capacity

Burkina Faso below 25,000 capacity

Burundi below 25,000 capacity

Cape Verde below 25,000 capacity

Cameroon below 25,000 capacity

Chad below 25,000 capacity

Comoros below 25,000 capacity

Congo below 25,000 capacity

Côte d'Ivoire below 25,000 capacity

Djibouti below 25,000 capacity

DR Congo below 25,000 capacity

Egypt below 25,000 capacity

Egypt below 25,000 capacity indoor stadiums

Equatorial Guinea below 25,000 capacity

Eswatini below 25,000 capacity

Ethiopia below 25,000 capacity

Gabon below 25,000 capacity

Ghana below 25,000 capacity

Guinea-Bissau below 25,000 capacity

Kenya below 25,000 capacity

Lesotho below 25,000 capacity

Liberia below 25,000 capacity

Libya below 25,000 capacity

Madagascar below 25,000 capacity

Malawi below 25,000 capacity

Mali below 25,000 capacity

Mauritania below 25,000 capacity

Morocco below 25,000 capacity

Mozambique below 25,000 capacity

Niger below 25,000 capacity

Nigeria below 25,000 capacity

Rwanda below 25,000 capacity

Rwanda below 25,000 capacity indoor stadiums

Senegal below 25,000 capacity

Senegal below 25,000 capacity indoor stadiums

Seychelles below 25,000 capacity

Somalia below 25,000 capacity

South Africa below 25,000 capacity

South Africa below 25,000 capacity indoor stadiums

Sudan below 25,000 capacity

Tanzania below 25,000 capacity

Togo below 25,000 capacity

Tunisia below 25,000 capacity

Tunisia below 25,000 capacity indoor stadiums

Uganda below 25,000 capacity

Western Sahara below 25,000 capacity

Zambia below 25,000 capacity

Zimbabwe below 25,000 capacity

See also

Lists of stadiums by continent

List of Asian stadiums by capacity
List of European stadiums by capacity
List of North American stadiums by capacity
List of Oceanian stadiums by capacity
List of South American stadiums by capacity

Lists of stadiums worldwide

 List of association football stadiums by capacity
 List of association football stadiums by country
 List of athletics stadiums
 List of baseball stadiums by capacity
 List of basketball arenas
 List of bullrings by capacity
 List of closed stadiums by capacity
 List of covered stadiums by capacity
 List of cricket grounds by capacity
 List of future stadiums
 List of indoor arenas
 List of indoor arenas by capacity
 List of rugby league stadiums by capacity
 List of rugby union stadiums by capacity
 List of sporting venues with a highest attendance of 100,000 or more
 List of sports venues by capacity
 List of stadiums by capacity
 List of tennis stadiums by capacity

Lists of stadiums by African country

List of football stadiums in Algeria
List of football stadiums in Angola
List of football stadiums in Benin
List of football stadiums in Botswana
List of football stadiums in Burkina Faso
List of football stadiums in Burundi
List of football stadiums in Cameroon
List of football stadiums in Cape Verde
List of football stadiums in Chad
List of football stadiums in the Comoros
List of football stadiums in the Congo
List of football stadiums in the Democratic Republic of the Congo
List of football stadiums in Djibouti
List of football stadiums in Egypt
List of football stadiums in Equatorial Guinea
List of football stadiums in Eswatini
List of football stadiums in Ethiopia
List of football stadiums in Gabon
List of football stadiums in Ghana
List of football stadiums in Guinea-Bissau
List of football stadiums in Ivory Coast
List of football stadiums in Kenya
List of football stadiums in Lesotho
List of football stadiums in Liberia
List of football stadiums in Libya
List of football stadiums in Madagascar
List of football stadiums in Malawi
List of football stadiums in Mali
List of football stadiums in Mauritania
List of football stadiums in Morocco
List of football stadiums in Mozambique
List of football stadiums in Niger
List of stadiums in Nigeria
List of football stadiums in Rwanda
List of football stadiums in Senegal
List of football stadiums in Seychelles
List of football stadiums in Somalia
List of indoor arenas in South Africa
List of stadiums in South Africa
List of football stadiums in South Sudan
List of football stadiums in Sudan
List of football stadiums in Tanzania
List of football stadiums in Togo
List of football stadiums in Tunisia
List of indoor arenas in Tunisia
List of football stadiums in Uganda
List of football stadiums in Zambia
List of football stadiums in Zimbabwe

Other

 List of indoor arenas in Africa
 List of stadiums in Africa
 List of attendance figures at domestic professional sports leagues
 List of professional sports leagues by revenue

References

StadiumDB
worldstadiums.com
www.sastadiums.com

Sport in Africa
Lists of stadiums
Stadium
Lists of sports venues with capacity
Football stadiums in Africa